Mountain Home is a historic home located near Front Royal, Warren County, Virginia. It was built in 1847, and is a two-story, three bay, brick Greek Revival style dwelling.  It has a two-story frame ell added in 1869.  Also on the property are the contributing mid-19th-century slave quarters, a meat house, a chicken coop, a shed, and two early-20th-century garages.

It was listed on the National Register of Historic Places in 2007.

References

Houses on the National Register of Historic Places in Virginia
Greek Revival houses in Virginia
Houses completed in 1847
Houses in Warren County, Virginia
National Register of Historic Places in Warren County, Virginia
1847 establishments in Virginia
Slave cabins and quarters in the United States